Hiragana Times (ひらがな タイムズ)  is a magazine published in Japan, and its audience is foreigners residing in Japan. The Hiragana Times is unique in that all the articles are written in both English and Japanese, with no bias between the languages. It has been published monthly in English and Japanese since 1986.

Background and profile
The name of Hiragana Times was inspired by the fact that all kanji in the magazine have hiragana translations adjacent to it. This is known as furigana, and it allows more novice readers to comprehend the articles in both languages.

The magazine is published monthly and contains articles of cultural importance to its readers with a mix of American and British stories.

References

External links
Hiragana Times official website

1986 establishments in Japan
Bilingual magazines
Expatriates in Japan
Local interest magazines
Magazines established in 1986
Magazines published in Japan
Monthly magazines published in Japan